Arshia Samsaminia (born 1989) is an Iranian composer.

Biography 
He studied contemporary composition at Sibelius Academy of Music in Finland, University of Gothenburg (Academy of Music and Drama) in Sweden, Universität der Künste Berlin in Germany, Estonian Academy of Music and Theatre under the supervision of Helena Tulve, Malin Bång, etc.

He has had composition and orchestrating projects, collaborations with Ensemble Modern, GEPO orchestra in Paris, Tbilisi Contemporary Ensemble, Omnibus contemporary Ensemble, Stockholm Saxophone Quartet, Aepex Contemporary Performance Sepia Ensemble Poland, Ensemble Garage Germany, etc.

His audio-visual work "Railroading in the East/Metro Project" has been selected for ART & SCIENCE DAY 2016 in France Bourges, AEPEX CONTEMPORARY MUSIC in USA Michigan and International Computer Music Conference 2018 Daegu, South Korea.

His compositions have been selected and performed in different festivals such as Gaudeamus Muziekweek, Sound of Stockholm, Tehran contemporary music festival, Poznań Contemporary Music Festival Poland, Mixtur Barcelona, UNM Nordisk Iceland, Eufonija Festival in Serbia, Lerici Music Festival “Suoni Dal Golfo” Italy, etc.

He attended in Masterclasses held by Tristan Murail, Georg Friedrich Haas, Rebecca Saunders,  Karlheinz Essl Jr., Pierluigi Billone, Georg Hajdu, Alexander Schubert, John Chowning, José María Sánchez-Verdú, Mauro Montalbetti, Klaus Lang, Dror Feiler, Michael Finnissy, Simon Steen-Andersen, Agusti Charles, etc.

His music has been performed in Germany, Netherlands, Poland, Iceland, USA, Italy, Estonia, Slovenia, Finland, Sweden, Spain, Serbia, Georgia, France, Armenia, Uzbekistan, Iran.

Works 
 "Sabā the wind" for Alto Saxophone and Chamber Orchestra, performed at Slovenian Philharmonic Hall, Ljubljana, Slovenia
 "A piece of monologue" for Drumset Solo and Electronics, performed by Ensemble Garage, Helsinki Finland, Köln Germany and New York USA
 "Gravity II" for Solo Piano and Electronics 2018, performed by Ricardo Descalzo in USA Chicago and South-Bend, Barcelona and Sofia
 "DreamScapes" for Baritone Saxophone and Piano 2017
 "SoundScapeS" for Solo Accordion 2017, performed at Eufonija 2017 Festival in Serbia
 "Miniatures" for Soprano Saxophone and Marimba/Vibraphone 2017 Performed at Sound of Stockholm 2017 Festival, Sweden
 "Echopraxia" commissioned by Cantus Ensemble 2017 Performed at Roudaki Hall 2017 Tehran, Iran
 "Rise from the Ashes" 2017, Performed at Estonian Music Days 2018, Tallinn, Estonia
 "In Eternity" Commissioned by Lerici Music Festival (Italy) 2017
 "Totally Enigmatic " Dedicated to Sepia Ensemble (Poland) 2017 Performed at Poznan Contemporary Music Festival 2017
 "4our" for Saxophone Quartet Dedicated to Stockholm Saxophone Quartet (2016)
 "Restrictions" for String Sextet Dedicated to TSC String Ensemble of Tbilisi State Conservatory(2016)
 "Metro Project" Audio-Visual piece selected by AEPEX contemporary performance (2016)
 "In Memoriam" for Solo Viola dedicated to Michael Hall (2015)
 “Parce Domine" for Organ, Flute, Violin, Trumpet, Timpani, orchestral chimes, Vibraphone (2015)
 “Sorrow” For Electric Guitar, Vibraphone, Soprano Voice, Piano o "Red and Blue dialogue" for Solo Clarinet (2014)
 “Caravan" for Mixed Choir 2012
 “Haiku” for Cello, Clarinet, Vibraphone trio 2012
 “Elegy For The Bells” for Violin, Chimes, Piano o "Drumutic Piece" for 12 percussions 2013
 “Brain’s Sound” Electro Acoustic Music 2011
 “Persepolis” for Piano, Violin, Cello 2012
 “From east to west” for Violin, Viola, Cello, Contrabass 2014
 “Deactivating atomic bomb" for 1 Piano and 4 Performers 2015
 “Abounded world with creatures still standing" for Large Orchestra 2015
 “Gravity" for Prepared Electric Guitar and Electronics 2013
 “Red and Blue Dialogues" for Clarinet Solo 2012
 “In a Trice" Theme and variation solo piano 2016

References

External links 
 Official Website - Arshia Samsaminia
 Arshia Samasminia's soundcloud
 Batumi Festival of Modern Music
 UMKC Composition workshop
 Avo directed by Golnaz Jamsheed, film music
 "4our" for Saxophone Quartet performed by STOCKHOLM SAXOPHONE QUARTET, Iran
 Metro Project/Railroading in the East
 “Disabling a bomb inside the Piano” for Piano Solo
 “From east to the west” for String Quartet, Performed by Omnibus Ensemble, Uzbekistan
 “Parce Domine” for Septet Ensemble, Performed by Tbilisi Contemporary Music Ensemble
 “Miniature " for solo Organ

1989 births
21st-century classical composers
20th-century classical composers
Living people
Iranian composers
People from Tehran
Male classical composers
20th-century male musicians
21st-century male musicians